Protection is an unincorporated community in Gilmer County, Georgia, United States.

History
A post office called Protection was established in 1890, and remained in operation until 1934. The origin of the name "Protection" is obscure.

References

Unincorporated communities in Gilmer County, Georgia
Unincorporated communities in Georgia (U.S. state)